John Oliver "Bolis" Pangelinan Gonzales is a Northern Mariana Islander activist and talk show host. Gonzales hosts and produces a local talk show, "John Gonzales Live," which is broadcast to viewers in the Northern Mariana Islands and Guam.

Additionally, Gonzales is an advocate of local culture in the Northern Mariana Islands and Micronesia. Gonzales unsuccessfully ran for delegate to the United States House of Representatives in the 2008 Northern Mariana Islands congressional election.  He placed third in the election, behind Gregorio Sablan and Pedro Tenorio, garnering 1,855 votes.

References

Northern Mariana Islands politicians
Northern Mariana Islands activists
American television talk show hosts
Northern Mariana Islands television producers
American television producers
Year of birth missing (living people)
Living people